Vempadu is a village in Eluru district of the Indian state of Andhra Pradesh. It is located in kalla mandal of Eluru revenue division.

Demographics 

 Census of India, Vempadu had a population of 2277. The total population constitute, 1140 males and 1137 females with a sex ratio of 997 females per 1000 males. 270 children are in the age group of 0–6 years with sex ratio of 1045. The average literacy rate stands at 63.58%.

References 

Villages in Eluru district